The Roman Catholic Diocese of Auckland is a Latin Rite diocese of the Catholic Church in Auckland, New Zealand. It was one of two dioceses in the country that were established on 20 June 1848. Auckland became a suffragan diocese of the Roman Catholic Archdiocese of Wellington in 1887. A large area of the diocese south of Auckland was split from the diocese on 6 March 1980 to form the Roman Catholic Diocese of Hamilton, New Zealand. In 2021 almost 40 per cent of New Zealand’s 471,000 Catholics lived within the diocese of Auckland.

Ordinaries of Auckland

Delargey was appointed Archbishop of Wellington in 1974 (Cardinal in 1976).
Browne was appointed Bishop of Hamilton in New Zealand in 1994.

Other bishops

Auxiliary bishops
 Reginald John Delargey (1914–1979) (Priest: 19 Mar 1938; Auxiliary Bishop: 25 Nov 1957; Bishop: 1 Sep 1970 to 25 Apr 1974); later Cardinal.
 Edward Gaines (Auxiliary Bishop: 28 Oct 1976 to 6 Mar 1980), appointed Bishop of Hamilton.
 John Hubert Macey Rodgers SM (1915–1997)  Vicar Apostolic of Tonga (1953–1957),  Vicar Apostolic of Tonga and Niue (1957–1966) Bishop of Tonga (1966–1973), Bishop of Rarotonga (1973–1977), Auxiliary Bishop of Auckland (1977–1985), Superior of the Mission, Funafuti, Tuvalu (1986).
 Patrick Dunn (Priest: 24 Apr 1976; Auxiliary Bishop: 10 Jun 1994; Bishop: 19 Dec 1994 to 17 Dec 2021).
 Michael Gielen (born 2 June 1971), Auxiliary Bishop of Auckland (2020–2022).

Coadjutor bishop
 James Michael Liston (1920–1929).

Bishop assistant
 Robin Walsh Leamy SM, Bishop Emeritus of Rarotonga, Cook Islands, (Bishop Assistant in Auckland: 1996–2009))

Other priests of this diocese who became bishops
Matthew Joseph Brodie, appointed Bishop of Christchurch in 1915
Peter Thomas McKeefry, appointed Coadjutor Archbishop of Wellington in 1947; Cardinal from 1969
Owen Noel Snedden, appointed Auxiliary Bishop of Wellington in 1962

Current bishops
 Stephen Lowe, 12th Bishop of Auckland (17 December 2021 - present)
 Michael Gielen, Auxiliary Bishop of Auckland (2 January 2020 – 21 May 2022)
 Patrick Dunn, Emeritus Bishop of Auckland
 Denis Browne, Emeritus Bishop of Hamilton
 Robin Walsh Leamy, retired Bishop Assistant (2009–present)

Cathedral
 St Patrick's Cathedral, Auckland

See also
 St Michael's Church, Remuera
 Holy Cross Seminary
 Marist Seminary
 Good Shepherd College
 Holy Name Seminary
 St Mary's Seminary
 Roman Catholicism in New Zealand
 List of New Zealand Catholic bishops
 Diocese of Rarotonga

Secondary schools

 Baradene College, Remuera, Auckland
 Carmel College, Milford, Auckland
 De La Salle College, Mangere East, Auckland
 Hato Petera College, Northcote, Auckland
 Liston College, Henderson Auckland
 Marcellin College, Royal Oak, Auckland
 Marist College, Mt Albert, Auckland
 McAuley High School, Otahuhu, Auckland
 Pompallier Catholic College, Maunu, Whangarei
 Rosmini College, Takapuna, Auckland
 Sacred Heart College, Glen Innes, Auckland
 Sancta Maria College, Howick, Auckland
 St Dominic's College, Henderson, Auckland
 St Ignatius of Loyola Catholic College, Drury, Auckland
 St Mary's College, Ponsonby, Auckland
 St Paul's College, Ponsonby, Auckland
 St Peter's College, Grafton, Auckland

References

External links

Auckland Catholic Diocese

Auckland
Christianity in Auckland
Auckland
Auckland
1848 establishments in New Zealand